Khamis  the 5th day in Arabic known as Thursday. It may refer to:

Khamis (name)
Khamis, Bahrain, a place in Bahrain
Khamis Brigade, special forces brigade of the military of Libya
Khamis Mushait, a city in Saudi Arabia